Gimme 5 was a children's television programme that broadcast on Saturday mornings on ITV from 25 April 1992 to 27 August 1994. The programme was a live two-hour show which included live guests, cartoons, competitions, and games. For series 1, the show was presented by Jenny Powell, Lewis MacLeod, Matthew Davies, and Nobby the Sheep. For series 2,  Paul Leyshon joined the Gimme 5 presenting team taking over from Lewis MacLeod. The programme was produced for three series by Tyne Tees Television from Studio 5, at their City Road studios.

Transmission guide

References

External links
 
 Gimme 5 on Paul Morris' SatKids

1992 British television series debuts
1994 British television series endings
1990s British children's television series
ITV children's television shows
British television shows featuring puppetry
Television series by ITV Studios
Television shows produced by Tyne Tees Television
English-language television shows